In architecture, a gorgerin (from the  meaning throat) is the neckline or portion of a capital of a column, or a feature forming the junction between a shaft and its capital.

References

Citations

Sources 

 
 

Architectural elements